Association Sportive et Culturelle Niarry Tally Grand-Dakar Biscuiterie is a football club from Senegal. The club is owned by Senegal's biscuit company known as Grand-Dakar Biscuiterie.

The club was founded on 21 February 1981, but the first football played in Grand-Dakar dates back to 1955.

Uniform
Its home uniform features a blue-crimson red T-shirt with opposite colour stripes on its rims going straight with thin white stripes on its sleeves, red shorts and white socks, its away uniform is entirely white but with thick grey sleeve stripes.

Its uniform up to around 2014 were a red-blue T-shirt with the sleeve colours opposite, also it had red shorts and white socks for home matches, its away uniform was white with a red-blue collar on top.

Honours
Senegal Premier League: 0

Senegal FA Cup: 1
 2016.

Coupe de la Ligue: 1
 2012.

Coupe de l'Assemblée Nationale du Sénégal: 1
 2016.

Trophée des Champions du Sénégal: 0

Super Coupe du Sénégal: 0

League and cup history

Performance in CAF competitions

National level

Chairmen history
 Lamine Dieng † (up to 2014/15)
 Moustapha Seck (as of the 2016-17 season)

Notes

External links
 Official site

Football clubs in Senegal
Sports clubs in Dakar
1981 establishments in Senegal
Association football clubs established in 1981